The 1967 Detroit Tigers season was a season in American baseball. The team finished tied for second in the American League with the Minnesota Twins with 91 wins and 71 losses, one game behind the AL pennant-winning Boston Red Sox.

The season is notable as during the middle of the 1967 season, a number of home games were cancelled due to the 1967 Detroit riots; this would be the last time a game would be cancelled due to rioting, until the 1992 LA Dodgers had their games cancelled due to the 1992 riots.

Regular season 
 On April 30, 1967, Baltimore Orioles pitcher Steve Barber threw a no-hitter versus the Detroit Tigers but lost in a 2-1 final. Barber would become the first pitcher in the history of the American League whose no-hit game ended in a loss.

Season standings

Record vs. opponents

Notable transactions 
 June 6, 1967: Geoff Zahn was drafted by the Tigers in the 2nd round of the secondary phase of the 1967 Major League Baseball draft, but did not sign.

Roster

Player stats

Batting

Starters by position 
Note: Pos = Position; G = Games played; AB = At bats; H = Hits; Avg. = Batting average; HR = Home runs; RBI = Runs batted in

Other batters 
Note: G = Games played; AB = At bats; H = Hits; Avg. = Batting average; HR = Home runs; RBI = Runs batted in

Pitching

Starting pitchers 
Note: G = Games pitched; IP = Innings pitched; W = Wins; L = Losses; ERA = Earned run average; SO = Strikeouts

Other pitchers 
Note: G = Games pitched; IP = Innings pitched; W = Wins; L = Losses; ERA = Earned run average; SO = Strikeouts

Relief pitchers 
Note: G = Games pitched; W = Wins; L = Losses; SV = Saves; ERA = Earned run average; SO = Strikeouts

Farm system 

LEAGUE CHAMPIONS: Toledo

Notes

References 

1967 Detroit Tigers season at Baseball Reference

Detroit Tigers seasons
Detroit Tigers season
Detroit Tiger
1967 in Detroit